Jaime Caupolicán Ramírez Banda (14 August 1931 – 26 February 2003) was a Chilean former professional footballer who played as a right winger.

Club career
Ramírez was skillful with the ball, he had great technique and even at his height, he did great heading, playing at the junior divisions of Bádminton F.C. (1946–1947), Universidad de Chile in 1949–1952, 1962 and 1966, he was a Colo-Colo champion with the team in 1956, O'Higgins, Huachipato, Audax Italiano, Unión San Felipe, Palestino and outside of his country of origin he played for Racing Club of Argentina, Espanyol from Barcelona and Granada from Spain. In this country, he showed so much ability that he was nicknamed "Superclase" meaning "Super-Class" by sports commentators and the media.

International career
Ramírez participated in 56 games for Chile, where 36 games were official games and he scored 13 goals. He made his debut in the national team on 17 September 1954, in a game against Peru, where Chile defeated Peru 2–1. But his most memorable presentations in the national team took place in 1962, where he scored two goals, one against Switzerland, and one against Italy. On the other hand, he was one of the best players of the tournament, playing frequently as a right winger, midfielder, and even left defender taking advantage of his many talents. His great performance attracted to Racing de Avellaneda from Argentina. At the end of his career and being aged 35 years old, he was a member of the Chile team that competed in the 1966 World Cup.

Managerial career
He was the manager of Olimpia in Honduras and both Sport Boys and Deportivo Cañaña in Peru.

Personal life
He was the son of Aníbal Ramírez, a Chile international footballer in the 1924 South American Championship.

Honors
Colo Colo
 Chilean Primera División: 1956

Universidad de Chile
 Chilean Primera División: 1962

Unión San Felipe
 Chilean Primera División: 1971

Chile
 Copa O'Higgins: 1957

References

External links
 
 Jaime Ramírez at PartidosdeLaRoja 
 Jaime Ramírez at playmakerstats.com (English version of ceroacero.es)

1931 births
2003 deaths
Footballers from Santiago
Chilean footballers
Chile international footballers
Chilean expatriate footballers
Chilean Primera División players
Universidad de Chile footballers
Colo-Colo footballers
O'Higgins F.C. footballers
Audax Italiano footballers
C.D. Huachipato footballers
Club Deportivo Palestino footballers
Unión San Felipe footballers
La Liga players
Segunda División players
RCD Espanyol footballers
Granada CF footballers
CE L'Hospitalet players
Argentine Primera División players
Racing Club de Avellaneda footballers
Expatriate footballers in Spain
Chilean expatriate sportspeople in Spain
Expatriate footballers in Argentina
Chilean expatriate sportspeople in Argentina
1962 FIFA World Cup players
1966 FIFA World Cup players
Association football wingers
Chilean football managers
Unión La Calera managers
C.D. Olimpia managers
Provincial Osorno managers
Sport Boys managers
Primera B de Chile managers
Peruvian Primera División managers
Expatriate football managers in Honduras
Chilean expatriate sportspeople in Honduras
Expatriate football managers in Peru
Chilean expatriate sportspeople in Peru